Johannes Hoff is a German Christian philosopher, theologian and university professor.

Born in Trier, Hoff completed his doctorate and habilitation at the University of Tübingen in 2006 and is currently senior research associate at the van Hügel Institute of the University of Cambridge (UK) and honorary professor at the Department of Theology and Religion of Durham University. Until 2018, he has been professor of philosophical theology at Heythrop College (University of London). Previously he has been teaching at St David's Catholic College in Wales and at the University of Tübingen.

His research builds on the performative turn of the phenomenological tradition and the emergence of a natural realism in the post-analytic tradition of Anglophone philosophy and theology. Hoff interprets the loss of orientation in today's late modern societies as the symptom of a spiritual crisis that can be traced back to the technological and artistic revolutions of the Renaissance and late medieval Scholasticism. His arguments extend the genealogical hermeneutics of Michel Foucault, Michel de Certeau, Henri de Lubac, John Milbank and Charles Taylor. The aim of his work is to retrieve the unity of spiritual practice, science and culture found in philosophers of the premodern and particularly the Dominican tradition (e.g. in Thomas Aquinas and Meister Eckhart).

In line with this aim, he argues in his most recent publications that we need to develop a post-digital rationality that is consistent with the spiritual and virtue ethical cultivation of our intuitive intelligence, and governed by our natural desire for the true, the beautiful and the good. The IT technologies of our present time are more than mere tools; they have a magic life on their own. According to Hoff, this requires us to recover our ability to distinguish between malevolent objects, that are designed to engender idolatrous attachments, and benevolent objects, that support our desire to transform our life to the better. In the wake of the confessionalization of religions in the post-Reformation era we have, according to Hoff, unlearnt the art of discernment. Yet, the modern conviction that we are autonomous subjects disguised that fact that our life has become increasingly governed by bureaucratic strategies of surveillance and control. According to Hoff, the digitisation of these strategies reveals their true character: The disenchantment of the Enlightenment tradition has turned into a kind of bad magic that needs to be counterbalanced by a sacramental re-enchantment. Since we had stopped inhabiting a disenchanted world, we would need to rethink the old tradition of the Discernment of Spirits: "Our smartphones have a 'magic life' of their own – be it that they afford a life that we appreciate, or that they nudge us into a life that we abhor. This challenge requires us to recover our ability to distinguish between idolatrous attachments and the prudent use of 'magic objects' that is consistent with our natural desire to transform our life for the better."

Hoff's earliest publication build on the philosophies of Jacques Derrida and Michel Foucault (Spiritualität und Sprachverlust, 1999) as well as on the Renaissance philosophy of Nicholas of Cusa (Kontingenz, Berührung, Überschreitung, 2007). This stream of his research culminated in his book The Analogical Turn: Rethinking Modernity with Nicholas of Cusa (2013), which was publicly discussed in 2016 in an online symposium of the Syndicate Network.

Related to this research are his publications on the concept of performativity in Augustine, Dante, the Renaissance, Romanticism and modern avant-garde art, and his collaboration with leading representatives of contemporary art, such as Christoph Schlingensief. In accordance with the above spiritual tradition, Hoff rejects in these writings the modern 'myth of the given' and argues that the truth has always the character of a 'truth event'. While it could never be secured, it could always only be gradually actualized whilst we are speaking and acting.

Selected articles
"Iconicity and the Anamorphosis of Social Space. Retrieving Nicholas of Cusa's Political Pneumatology", in: Dürr, Walther; Vergauwen, Guido; et al. (eds.), Veni, Sancte Spiritus! Theologische Beiträge zur Sendung des Geistes. [Contributions to the mission of the spirit] (Münster: Aschendorff 2018).
"Diesseits von Theismus und Pan(en)theismus: Orthodoxie in einer Post-digitalen Welt". [Re-thinking the False Dualism between Theism and Pantheism: Orthodoxy in a Post-digital Age] In: Nitsche, Bernhard; Stosch, Klaus von, Tatari, Muna (eds.): Gott – Jenseits von Monismus und Theismus?" (Paderborn: Schöningh 2016), 291–309 
"Life in Abundance. Schlingensief's Deconstruction of (Post-)Modernism". In: Susanne Gaensheimer (ed.), German Pavilion, 2011. 54th International Art Exhibition La Biennale Di Venezia. Venice: Sternberg Press 2011, pp. 215–225.
"Self-Revelation as Hermeneutic Principle? The Rise and the Fall of the Kantian Paradigm of Modern Theology". In: Conor Cunningham; Peter M. Candler (eds.), The Grandeur of Reason: Religion, Tradition and Universalism, London: SCM 2010.
Hampson, P. J.; Hoff, J., "Whose self? Which unification? Augustine's anthropology and the psychology-theology debate." In: New Blackfriars (2010) (Abstract)
"German Theology in Contemporary Society". In: Modern Believing'' (special issue, ed. by Johannes Hoff) 50/1 (2009), 2–12.

References

Catholic philosophers
21st-century German Catholic theologians
Living people
German male non-fiction writers
Year of birth missing (living people)